John Cafferty & The Beaver Brown Band is an American rock band from Rhode Island which began its career in 1972, and achieved mainstream success in the 1980s. Originally known as simply Beaver Brown, they got their name from a paint can. The classic lineup of the group (consisting of John Cafferty on vocals and guitar, Gary Gramolini on lead guitar, Pat Lupo on bass, Kenny Jo Silva on drums, Bobby Cotoia on keyboards, and Michael "Tunes" Antunes on saxophone) started out as a New England bar band based in Narragansett, Rhode Island and established a following up and down the Northeast corridor with strongholds in the beach resort towns of Narragansett and Misquamicut, Rhode Island; New York City; New Haven, Connecticut; Boston, Massachusetts; and Asbury Park, New Jersey.

History
They first achieved success with a 1980 self-released single pairing two of their songs, "Wild Summer Nights" and "Tender Years", which sold over 10,000 copies and had radio play up and down the Atlantic seaboard. Despite their success, the act was ignored by the major labels due to persistent critical comparisons to Bruce Springsteen & The E Street Band. They finally achieved international success when producer Kenny Vance, a longtime fan, offered them the score to a movie soundtrack he was helming based on a best-selling novel about a legendary bar band, Eddie and the Cruisers. Thanks to frequent airings of the film on HBO and the purchase of the soundtrack album by their established fanbase, as well as hundreds of thousands of new converts, Eddie and the Cruisers: Original Motion Picture Soundtrack reached the top 10 on the Billboard 200 chart, and produced a number 7 hit single ("On the Dark Side") on the Billboard Hot 100. "On the Dark Side" also held number-one on the Album Rock Tracks chart for five weeks. The album was eventually certified triple platinum by the RIAA.

The group's follow-up album Tough All Over (1985) made the top 40, enjoying great sales for "C-I-T-Y" and the title track, which became their second number-one single on the Mainstream Rock Tracks chart. Another song from that album, "Voice of America's Sons", was the featured theme song on the official soundtrack of the action movie Cobra (1986), starring Sylvester Stallone, and Cafferty's solo track "Heart's on Fire" was featured in another Stallone movie, Rocky IV (1985).

The band's next album, the self-produced Roadhouse, sold well to their fan base but did not reach the sales heights of Tough All Over. In 1989, they followed it with the score to an "Eddie" sequel, Eddie and the Cruisers II: Eddie Lives! which became their last major label release of new material.

Several personnel changes occurred over the next few years with Kenny Jo Silva departing in 1992 and Pat Lupo in 1994 to be replaced, respectively, by Jackie Santos, formerly of Tavares, and Dean Cassell. Bobby Cotoia had been forced to retire from the road during the 1990s due to illness, but remained an active member of the group in the studio. His on-stage replacement was Steve Burke who remains in the line-up. Cotoia died from liver disease on September 3, 2004, leaving behind a wife and two children.  On many of the band's shows over the past decade, drummer Don "DC" Culp has filled the role when Santos is not available.

In 2016, Rolling Stone ranked the fictional Eddie and the Cruisers at No. 18 in their list of 25 Greatest Movie Bands.

John Cafferty & The Beaver Brown Band continue to tour. Their music has appeared on the soundtracks of several major motion pictures including There's Something About Mary (1998) and Dumb and Dumber To (2014).

Original bassist Pat Lupo died on June 21, 2021 at the age of 66.

In August 2021, the band were the headline performers at the Providence Performing Arts Center's first in-person event since the beginning of the COVID-19 pandemic the previous year, sharing the bill with Southside Johnny and the Asbury Jukes.

In September 2022, the band celebrated its 50th anniversary with the release of its first Greatest Hits album.

Discography

Studio albums

Compilation albums

Singles

Members
 Current members
 John Cafferty - lead vocals, rhythm guitar (1972–present)
 Gary Gramolini - backing vocals, lead guitar
 Michael "Tunes" Antunes - backing vocals, saxophone (197?-present)
 Dean Cassell - bass (1994–present)
 Steve Burke - keyboards (199?–present)
 Jackie Santos - drums (1992–present)

 Former members
 Bobby Cotoia - piano, synthesizer, keyboards (1972–2004; died September 3, 2004)
 Paul "Cozy" Jackson - saxophone, keyboards
 Fred Macari - saxophone
 Thom Enright - bass, guitar
 Patrick Lupo - bass (1972–1994; died June 21, 2021)
 Kenny Jo Silva - drums (1972–1992)

References

Bibliography
 Himes, Jeffrey (October 24, 1984). "Beaver Brown: Maturity and Power". The Washington Post.

External links
 Official website
 Historical Archive Full Biography/Complete Discography—Rhode Island Music Hall of Fame (RIMHOF)
 John Cafferty & The Beaver Brown Band Booking Information - GigMasters
 John Cafferty and the Beaver Brown Band at AllMusic
 

People from Narragansett, Rhode Island
Rock music groups from Rhode Island
Scotti Brothers Records artists